The South African Literary Awards (SALA) have been awarded annually since 2005 to exceptional South African writers. They "pay tribute to South African writers who have distinguished themselves as ground-breaking producers and creators of literature" and celebrate "literary excellence in the depiction and sharing of South Africa’s histories, value systems, philosophies and art." The Awards are open to work in all of South Africa's eleven official languages, and they may include posthumous honours.

Since 2005, the number of awards has multiplied — there are now fourteen categories, recognising a variety of literary forms. There are categories for children’s literature, youth literature, literary journalism, novels, poetry, creative non-fiction, debut works, and literary translation; and two named awards, the K. Sello Duiker Memorial Award (for novelists under the age of 40) and the Nadine Gordimer Short Story Award. Lifetime achievement is recognised in the Poet Laureate Prizes and the Lifetime Achievement, Posthumous, and Chairperson’s Awards.

SALA was founded by the wRite associates in partnership with the South African Department of Arts and Culture. Since 2012, the awards have been given at the annual Africa Century International Writers Conference. The inaugural conference was hosted by the University of the Free State in 2012, supported by the SABC. As of 2021, the winner in each category received R30 000, and the National Poet Laureate received R100 000.

Poet Laureate Prizes

National Poet Laureate Prize 
Mazisi Kunene (2005-2006)
 Keorapetse Kgositsile (2006-2018)
 Mongane Wally Serote (2018-present)

Regional Poets Laureate Prize 

 Ronelda Kamfer, Afrikaans (2021)
 Themba Patrick Magaisa, Tsonga (2021)
The Regional Poet Laureate Prize was awarded for the first time in 2021. The prize is intended to guide the selection of future National Poet Laureates.

K. Sello Duiker Memorial Award 
The K. Sello Duiker Memorial Award, named for the South African novelist K. Sello Duiker, recognises novels and novellas by authors under the age of 40. The age limitation was not in place in the Award’s early years.

Nadine Gordimer Short Story Award 
The Nadine Gordimer Short Story Award, named for the South African novelist and short story writer Nadine Gordimer, recognises short story collections by a single author.

Novel Award

Creative Non-Fiction Award

First-Time Published Author Award 
The First-Time Published Author Award is open to works of all genres whose authors who have not been published before in any genre.

Poetry Award

Children's Literature Award 
The Children's Literature Award recognises works of fiction for children by adult authors.

Youth Literature Award 
The Youth Literature Award recognises works of fiction written for readers aged 12 to 18.

Literary Journalism Award 
The Literary Journalism Award recognises those who, through print or electronic media, "have made a significant contribution to the promotion and development of South African literature through writing, commentating, advocating and critiquing." As of 2007, it was sponsored by the Sowetan and the SABC.

Literary Translators Award 
The Literary Translators Award is open to South African literary works, or literary works translated by a South African, of any genre. It was awarded for the first time in 2008.

Posthumous Literary Award 
The Posthumous Literary Award is awarded on the basis of an author's "overall literary achievement."

Chairperson's Literary Award 
The Chairperson's Literary Award is awarded at the discretion of the Chairperson of the SALA Advisory Board.

Lifetime Achievement Literary Award 
The Lifetime Achievement Literary Award is awarded to authors over the age of 60 on the basis of their "overall literary achievement."

References 

South African literary awards
Fiction awards